The 2023 Indonesian men's Proliga (or 2023 PLN Mobile Proliga for sponsorship reasons) is the 21st season of Indonesian men's Proliga, The Indonesian professional volleyball league organized by the Indonesian Volleyball Federation since 2002. The season start on 5 January 2023 and conclude in 19 March 2023.

This season composed of 8 teams, including the two new teams — Jakarta Bhayangkara Presisi ​​and Jakarta STIN BIN.

Jakarta LavAni Allo Bank  won their second title in two consecutive seasons, after defeating Jakarta Bhayangkara Presisi in five sets on the final.

Teams

Personnel

Foreign players 
Foreign player regulations In implementing the 2023 Proliga this season, each team must sign 1 foreign player and a maximum of 2 foreign players. In the second leg regular season each team is allowed to replace 1 foreign player.

Schedule and venues 
The 2023 Indonesian men's Proliga take place in eight cities. The regular season held from 5 January to 19 February 2023 which take place in six cities, namely Bandung, Purwokerto, Palembang, Gresik, Malang  and Yogyakarta. 

The final round which held from 23 February to 19 March 2023 take place in four cities, namely Gresik, Semarang, Solo and Yogyakarta. The following is the schedule and venues for the 2023 Indonesian men's Proliga:

Regular season 
Leg 1
 Week 1 (January 5–8)
 Sabilulungan Jalak Harupat Sports Hall, Bandung, West Java
 Week 2 (January 12–15)
 Satria Sports Hall, Purwokerto, Central Java
 Week 3 (January 19–22)
 Palembang Sport and Convention Center, Palembang, South Sumatra

Leg 2
 Week 4 (February 2–5)
 Tri Dharma Sports Hall, Gresik, East Java
 Week 5 (February 9–12)
 Ken Arok Sports Center, Malang, East Java
 Week 6 (February 16–19)
 UNY Sports Hall, Yogyakarta, Special Region of Yogyakarta

Final round 
Semifinals
 Week 7 (February 23–26)
 Tri Dharma Sports Hall, Gresik, East Java
 Week 8 (March 2–5)
 Jatidiri Sports Complex, Semarang, Central Java
 Week 9 (March 9–12)
 Sritex Arena Sports Hall, Solo, Central Java

3rd place & Final
 Week 10 (March 19)
 Among Rogo Sports Hall, Yogyakarta, Special Region of Yogyakarta

Squads 
Under the current season rules, each team involved in the tournament is required to register a maximum of 16 rosters including 2 foreign players.

Jakarta Bhayangkara Presisi 
The following is Jakarta Bhayangkara Presisi's roster in the 2023 Indonesian men's Proliga.

Head Coach:  Toiran Reidel

1  Frisca Abriantama 
2  Arjuna Mahendra 
3  Jovan Al Lathief 
4  Daudi Okello 
5  Raden Ahmad Gumilar 
6  Mohamad Sadam 
7  Alfin Daniel 
8  Nizar Julfikar 
9  Yuda Mardiansyah 
10  Vaisal Faris 
11  Rendy Verdian Licardo 
13  Hernanda Zulfi 
14  Henry Ade Novian 
17  Rendy Tamamilang 
18  Garrett Muagututia 
19  Fahreza Rakha

Jakarta BNI 46 
The following is Jakarta BNI 46's roster in the 2023 Indonesian men's Proliga.

Head Coach:  Walfidrus Wahyu

2  Ilham Akbar 
3  Sigit Ardian 
6  Imam Ahmad Faisal 
7  Kaula Nurhidayat 
8  Dhani Anggriawan 
9  Achmad Rizal 
11  Ade Candra Rachmawan 
12  Risky Ramadan 
13  I Kadek Juliadi 
15  Faisal Ashar Arafli 
16  Muhamad Kadavi 
17  Cahya Wismoyojati 
18  Rian Irawan 
20  Petar Premović 
21  Samuel Holt 
99  Veleg Dhany Ristan

Jakarta LavAni Allo Bank 
The following is Jakarta LavAni Allo Bank's roster in the 2023 Indonesian men's Proliga.

Head Coach:  Nicolas Vives 

1  Daffa Naufal 
2  Yohanes Dedi 
3  Boy Arnes 
4  Hendra Kurniawan 
5  Musabikhan 
6  Leandro Martins 
7  Elvin Fajar 
8  Prasojo 
9  Jordan Susanto 
10  Fahri Septian 
11  Muhammad Malizi 
12  Irpan 
15  Dio Zulfikri 
16  Reihan Andiko 
17  Jorge García 
20  Nanda Waliyu

Jakarta Pertamina Pertamax 
The following is Jakarta Pertamina Pertamax's roster in the 2023 Indonesian men's Proliga.

Head Coach:  Putut Marheanto

1  Aleksandar Minić 
2  Yogi Kurniawan 
3  Antho Bertiyawan 
4  Yoendri Kindelan 
5  Febrian Adhe 
6  Fadilla Rahmatullah 
9  Edy Kumara 
10  I Nyoman Julianta 
11  I Made Vandim 
12  Ryno Viagustama 
13  Vilar Juni Hilal 
14  Ogi Alexander 
15  Delly Heryanto 
17  I Made Adhi Suartama 
18  Robbi Rimbawan 
21  Luvi Febrian

Jakarta STIN BIN 
The following is Jakarta STIN BIN's roster in the 2023 Indonesian men's Proliga.

Head Coach:  Alessandro Ferreira 

3  Fauzan Nibras 
4  Bintang Saputra 
5  Bagus Wahyu Ardianto 
6  Rozalin Penchev 
7  Andre Krisdiantono 
8  Jasen Natanael 
9  Farhan Halim 
11  Dimas Saputra 
12  Isac Santos 
13  Muhamad Ridwan 
14  Stephanus Ardian 
15  Fikri Mustofa 
17  Ujang Nandar 
18  Yayan Riyanto 
20  Sunanda Abdillah 
21  Cep Indra Agustin

Kudus Sukun Badak 
The following is Kudus Sukun Badak's roster in the 2023 Indonesian men's Proliga.

Head Coach:  Ibarsjah Djanu

1  Made Harin 
2  Viko Zulfan 
3  Adik Tri Yuliyanto 
4  Sapta Rafi Sanjaya 
6  Muhammad Saiful Anwar 
7  Hamish Hazelden 
8  Rifki Ferdianto 
10  Muhammad Adnan Al'ihza 
11  Agung Seganti 
12  Louis Ardian 
13  Mochamad Syahril Amri 
15  Dimas Setiawan 
16  Bastian Tamtomo 
17  Aji Maulana 
18  Rahmat Kurniadi 
24  Jared Jarvis

Palembang Bank Sumsel Babel 
The following is Palembang Bank Sumsel Babel's roster in the 2023 Indonesian men's Proliga.

Head Coach:  Lee Young-taek

1  Gani Loveano 
2  Adi Putra Firmansyah 
3  Muhammad Teguh 
4  Mahfud Nurcahyadi 
6  Febriyanto 
7  Samsul Kohar 
8  Song Jun-ho 
9  Sandy Akbar 
10  Roy Satrio Fernando 
11  Solimou Souaré 
12  Denie Arya Wicaksana 
13  Dio Panji Rahmadi 
14  Muhamad Syaifudin Najib 
15  Andi Purnomo 
17  Gunawan Saputra 
19  Hayun Muhammad

Surabaya BIN Samator 
The following is Surabaya BIN Samator's roster in the 2023 Indonesian men's Proliga..

Head Coach:  Ahmad Masajedi 

1  Daouda Yacoubou 
2  Paulo Lamounier 
3  Galih Bayu Saputra 
4  Tedi Oka Syahputra 
5  Ega Yuri Pradana 
6  Hadi Suharto 
7  Rama Fazza Fauzan 
8  Bagas Farhan 
10  Ageng Wardoyo 
12  Rivan Nurmulki 
13  Richi Rizky 
14  Yoga Prastyo 
15  Hendrik Agel 
16  Devan Rizky 
17  Agil Anggara 
18  I Putu Randu

Pool standing procedure 
 Total number of victories (matches won, matches lost)
 In the event of a tie, the following first tiebreaker will apply: The teams will be ranked by the most points gained per match as follows:
Match won 3–0 or 3–1: 3 points for the winner, 0 points for the loser
Match won 3–2: 2 points for the winner, 1 point for the loser
Match forfeited: 3 points for the winner, 0 points (0–25, 0–25, 0–25) for the loser
 If teams are still tied after examining the number of victories and points gained, then the PBVSI will examine the results in order to break the tie in the following order:
Sets quotient: if two or more teams are tied on the number of points gained, they will be ranked by the quotient resulting from the division of the number of all sets won by the number of all sets lost.
Points quotient: if the tie persists based on the sets quotient, the teams will be ranked by the quotient resulting from the division of all points scored by the total of points lost during all sets.
If the tie persists based on the points quotient, the tie will be broken based on the team that won the match of the Round Robin Phase between the tied teams. When the tie in points quotient is between three or more teams, these teams ranked taking into consideration only the matches involving the teams in question.

Regular season 
 Eight teams play 2 legs with a double round robin system. 
 The top four ranked teams advance to the final round.
 All times are local, WIB (UTC+07:00)

League table 

|}

Fixtures and results

Leg 1 
|-
!colspan=12|Week 1 — Bandung
|-

|-
!colspan=12|Week 2 — Purwokerto
|-

|-
!colspan=12|Week 3 — Palembang
|-

|}

Leg 2 
|-
!colspan=12|Week 4 — Gresik
|-

|-
!colspan=12|Week 5 — Malang
|-

|-
!colspan=12|Week 6 — Yogyakarta
|-

|}

Final round 
 In the final round Indonesian Volleyball Federation use video challenge technology.
 Four teams played 2 legs with a double round robin system. 
 3rd and 4th rank advance to the 3rd place match, and 1st and 2nd rank advance to the final.
 All times are local, WIB (UTC+07:00)

Semifinals

League table 

|}

Fixtures and results 
|-
!colspan=12|Week 7 — Gresik
|-

|-
!colspan=12|Week 8 — Semarang
|-

|-
!colspan=12|Week 9 — Solo
|-

|}

3rd place match
|}

Final 
|}

Final standings

Awards 

Most Valuable Player
 Fahri Septian (Jakarta LavAni Allo Bank)
Best coach
 Nicolas Vives (Jakarta LavAni Allo Bank)
Best Scorer
 Rivan Nurmulki (Surabaya BIN Samator)
Best Libero
 Muhamad Ridwan (Jakarta STIN BIN)
Best Setter
 Dio Zulfikri (Jakarta LavAni Allo Bank)
Best Blocker
 Hendra Kurniawan (Jakarta LavAni Allo Bank)
Best Spiker
 Daudi Okello (Jakarta Bhayangkara Presisi)
Best Server
 Farhan Halim (Jakarta STIN BIN)

References

External links 
 Official website
 Indonesian Volleyball Federation website

Indonesian men's Proliga
Indonesian men's Proliga
Indonesian men's Proliga